Tumut Pond Dam is a major ungated concrete arch dam across the upper reaches of the Tumut River in the Snowy Mountains of New South Wales, Australia. The dam's main purpose is for the generation of hydro-power and is one of the sixteen major dams that comprise the Snowy Mountains Scheme, a vast hydroelectricity and irrigation complex constructed in south-east Australia between 1949 and 1974 and now run by Snowy Hydro.

The impounded reservoir is called the Tumut Pond Reservoir, or less formally, the Tumut Pondage.

Location and features
The dam was constructed by a consortium comprising Kaiser-Walsh-Perini-Raymond based on engineering plans developed by the United States Bureau of Reclamation under contract from the Snowy Mountains Hydroelectric Authority.

At 100% capacity the dam wall holds back  of water. The spillway is capable of discharging .

The crest of the dam wall forms part of the road between Cabramurra and Khancoban. The road is closed to through traffic in winter as it is not routinely cleared of snow and ice.

Power generation

The power station has  rated hydraulic head.

Tumut Pond Reservoir
Tumut Pond Reservoir or Tumut Pond Pondage (sometimes also Tumut 1 Reservoir/Tumut 1 Pondage) is formed by the Tumut Pond Dam. Snowmelt and other runoff enter the reservoir from the upper Tumut River and the dam impounds the river's natural flow below the Tumut Two Dam wall.

Water from the reservoir, after passing over the spillway of the Tumut Pond Dam, flows downstream, above the underground Tumut 1 Power Station, and into the impounded waters of Talbingo Reservoir, formed by the Talbingo Dam; past Tumut 3 Power Station, into Jounama Pondage, formed by Jounama Dam; and then into Blowering Reservoir, formed by Blowering Dam, passing through Blowering Power Stations. The natural flow of the Tumut River continues into the Riverina region.

See also

 List of dams and reservoirs in New South Wales
 Snowy Hydro Limited
 Snowy Mountains Scheme
 Tumut Hydroelectric Power Station

References

External links
 

Dams in New South Wales
Snowy Mountains Scheme
Dams completed in 1959
Arch dams
Dams in the Murray River basin
1959 establishments in Australia